The women's trap competition at the 2010 Asian Games in Guangzhou, China was held on 19 November at the Guangzhou Shotgun Centre.

Schedule
All times are China Standard Time (UTC+08:00)

Records

Results

Qualification

Final

References

ISSF Results Overview

External links
Official website

Women Shotgun T